Syriac Catholic Cathedral of Saint Paul is the cathedral of the Syriac Catholic Church, located in Damascus, Syria. It is the see of the Syriac Catholic Archeparchy of Damascus and is located in the Christian quarter of Damascus, 100 m west of Bab Sharqi.

See also
Syriac Catholic Church
Catholic Church in Syria

References

External links

Eastern Catholic cathedrals in Syria
Cathedrals in Damascus
Syriac Catholic cathedrals